Noyes is an English surname of patronymic origin, deriving from the given name Noah. Notable people with the surname include:

 Albertina Noyes (born 1949), American figure skater
 Alfred Noyes (1880–1958), English poet
 Arthur Amos Noyes (1866–1936), American chemist, inventor and educator
 Arthur Noyes (organist) (1862–1929), church organist in South Australia
 Arthur Percy Noyes (1880–1963), psychiatric administrator and educator
 Arthur H. Noyes (1853–1915), U.S. federal judge
 Beppie Noyes (1919–2007), American author and illustrator
 Blanche Noyes (1900–1981), American pioneering female aviator 
 Clara Noyes (1869–1936), American nurse and Director of the Red Cross Nursing Service during World War I
 Crosby Stuart Noyes (1825–1908), American newspaper publisher
 Dorothy Noyes (born 1960), American folklorist and ethnologist
 Edward Noyes (c. 1858–1920), co-founder of Australian engineering company Noyes Brothers
 Edward Follansbee Noyes (1832–1890), Republican politician from Ohio
 Eliot Noyes (1910–1977), American architect and designer
 Florence Fleming Noyes (1871–1928), American classical dancer
 Frances Noyes Hart (1890–1943), American writer
 Frederick Bogue Noyes (1872–1961), American dentist
 Fred W. Noyes Jr. (1905–1987), American artist and entrepreneur, founder of the Noyes Museum of Art
 George Lorenzo Noyes (1863–1945), American artist and mineralogist 
 Haskell Noyes (1886–1948), American conservationist
 Henry Noyes (c. 1860–1922) co-founder of Australian engineering company Noyes Brothers
 Henry Halsey Noyes (1910–2005), American writer
 Henry Sanborn Noyes (1822–1870), president of Northwestern University
 Jansen Noyes, Jr. (1918–2004), American investment banker
 John Noyes (politician) (1764–1841), Vermont politician
 John Noyes (entomologist) (born 1949) Welsh entomologist
 John Humphrey Noyes (1811–1886), founder of the Oneida Community in the US
 Joseph C. Noyes (1798–1868), United States Representative from Maine
 Kenny Noyes (born 1979), American motorcycle road racer
 Maty Noyes (born 1997), American singer-songwriter 
 Newbold Noyes, Jr. (1918–1997), American publisher
 Nicholas Noyes, colonial minister during the time of the Salem witch trials of 1692
 Paul Noyes, American football coach in the 1893 season
 Peter Noyes, former Vice-Chancellor of University of Wales, Newport
 Peter Noyes, English MP for Andover in 1614
 Samuel Noyes (1754–1845), co-founder of the Noyes Academy
 Walter Chadwick Noyes (1865–1926), American judge
 William A. Noyes (1857–1941), American analytical and organic chemist
 William Curtis Noyes (1805–1864), American jurist
 Win Noyes (1889-1969), American baseball pitcher

See also
 General Noyes (disambiguation)
 Kenneth Noye, British criminal
 Noyce, a variant of the surname

References

English-language surnames
Patronymic surnames